Thomas Mathis (born 25 April 1990) is an Austrian sports shooter. He competed in the men's 50-metre rifle prone event at the 2016 Summer Olympics.

References

External links
 

1990 births
Living people
Austrian male sport shooters
Olympic shooters of Austria
Shooters at the 2016 Summer Olympics
ISSF rifle shooters
People from Feldkirch, Vorarlberg
European Games competitors for Austria
Shooters at the 2015 European Games
Sportspeople from Vorarlberg
21st-century Austrian people